Mary Akrivopoulou (born 1975 in Thessaloniki) is a Greek actress. She is best known for her roles on Ton Ilio Tou Aiyaiou and Erotas. During the September 2007 parliamentary elections, she was a candidate MP of PASOK party for the region of Thessaloniki.

External links
 
official site

1975 births
Living people
Actors from Thessaloniki
Greek television actresses
Greek film actresses
Greek stage actresses
PASOK politicians
Politicians from Thessaloniki